This is a list of U.S. states, U.S. territories, and the District of Columbia by exports of goods and imports of goods as of 2018.

An export in international trade is a good or service produced in one country that is bought by someone in another country. The sum of the exports of the states is significantly lower than the value of the United States' total exports. The difference results from goods originating from states of origin, returned goods and goods with unidentified states of origin.

An import in international trade is a good or service produced in one country that is bought (imported) by someone in another country. The sum of the imports of the states is lower than the value of the United States' total imports. The difference results from goods originating from states of origin, returned goods and goods with unidentified states of origin.

Overall, Texas has the highest export rank, while the Northern Mariana Islands has the lowest export rank. California has the highest import rank, while American Samoa has the lowest import rank.

Exports

Imports

See also 

List of countries by imports
List of countries by exports
 Foreign trade of the United States
State import statistics by the International Trade Administration
 STATS America state-level rankings

Notes

References 

States by exports and imports
exports and imports
United States, exports and imports
Foreign trade of the United States